Andrew Lewis (October 9, 1720 – September 26, 1781) was an Irish-born American pioneer, surveyor, military officer and politician in Colonial Virginia and during the American Revolutionary War. A colonel of militia during the French and Indian War, and brigadier general in the American Revolutionary War, his most famous victory was the Battle of Point Pleasant in Dunmore's War in 1774, although he also drove Lord Dunmore's forces from Norfolk and Gwynn's Island in 1776. He also helped found Liberty Hall (later Washington and Lee University) in 1776.

Early and family life
Lewis was born in County Donegal, Ireland, to Col. John Lewis (d. 1762) and his wife Margaret Lynn. In 1732 John Lewis, having killed his landlord in an altercation, fled to Virginia with his sons Andrew and Thomas. They became among the first settlers in then vast western Augusta County, John Lewis having received a large land grant before emigrating.

Andrew Lewis received a basic education and learned the skills of a surveyor. He spent at least fifteen years farming and working as a surveyor in southwestern Virginia. In 1751 he and his father explored much of the Greenbrier District of Augusta County (which much later became later Greenbrier County, West Virginia). John Lewis named the Greenbrier River after getting stuck in a patch of the thorny plant. Andrew Lewis also served as county lieutenant and later captain in the Augusta County militia.

Early in the 1740s Andrew Lewis married Elizabeth Givens, daughter of Samuel and Sarah (Cathey) Givens, formerly of County Antrim, Ireland. They established their own home, called Richfield, in what later became Roanoke County near Salem. Their children included: Samuel (c.1748-1763), John (1750–1788), Thomas (1752–1800), Andrew Jr. (1759–1844), Anna (who married Andrew Lambert (1768-1845))), William (1764–1812) and Charles (c.1768-1781). Their granddaughter Agatha Strother (1779-1852), married Elijah McClanahan.

French and Indian War
The Virginia frontier became a battleground in the French and Indian War, as did the frontiers of the more northerly colonies of Pennsylvania (which like Virginia also claimed land west of the Appalachian Mountains) and Maryland (whose boundary ended at the Appalachians). Virginia organized provincial troops to defend settlers subject to attacks by Indians upset at encroachments into their territories; Lewis became a captain in George Washington's Virginia Regiment. After the loss at the Battle of Great Meadows in 1754, Washington was forced to surrender to the French. Lewis was then at Fort Necessity (now in Pennsylvania) and likewise retreated eastward across the Appalachians.

Washington proposed a series of frontier fortifications to protect settlers east of the Appalachians. Lewis initially built Fort Dinwiddie on the Jackson River of present-day Bath County, but was relieved of his command September 21, 1755. The Virginia assembly soon approved Lewis' promotion to major and assigned him to oversee the region along the Greenbrier River. On February 18, 1756, Lewis led the Sandy Creek Expedition from Fort Frederick with a mixed force of militiamen and Cherokees to raid the Shawnee towns along the Big Sandy and Ohio rivers to retaliate for Shawnee attacks. Lewis led several expeditions against both Indian settlements and French outposts. During the Forbes Expedition, Lewis was captured during Major James Grant's attack on Fort Duquesne in September 1758. Taken to Quebec, Lewis remained a prisoner until late 1759.

Between wars
The Proclamation of 1763 officially restricted Virginia's western expansion across the Appalachians, but Lewis continued his hunting and exploration trips into what later became West Virginia. When relative peace returned, Lewis entered politics. Three years after the formation of Botetourt County from Augusta County in 1769, Botetourt County voters elected Lewis and John Bowyer as their part-time representatives in the House of Burgesses and reelected the pair several times before 1780, though the grueling travel to Williamsburg or later Richmond, as well as the American Revolution  precluded much attendance in later years.

In 1774, Virginia's Governor Dunmore led a force to Fort Pitt and into the Ohio Country, in what became known as Dunmore's War. Lewis, now promoted to colonel, led a second force by a more southern route. Shawnee Chief Cornstalk attacked Lewis' force while it was camped at the Ohio River crossing at Point Pleasant. Lewis' victory in the Battle of Point Pleasant on October 10, 1774, secured his military reputation.

Lewis became one of the founding trustees of Liberty Hall, formerly the Augusta Academy, along with his brother Thomas Lewis, Samuel McDowell, Sampson Mathews, George Moffett, William Preston, and James Waddel. In 1776 the academy was renamed in a burst of revolutionary fervor and relocated to Lexington, Virginia. Chartered in 1782 by the new Commonwealth of Virginia, Liberty Hall was again renamed, to Washington College. After the American Civil War it became Washington and Lee University, and is now the nation's ninth oldest institution of higher education.

American Revolution
When the American Revolution began, Governor Dunmore suspended Virginia's legislature. The Whigs (soon to become American rebels) formed a provisional Virginia legislature, which included both Andrew Lewis (from Botetourt County) and his brother Thomas (from Augusta County) as delegates. When the Continental Congress created a Continental Army in 1775 and made George Washington its commander, he asked that Lewis be made a brigadier general. Initially the Continental Congress had decided there should be only one general from each state, and the more experienced Charles Lee became Virginia's only commissioned Brigadier General.

In March 1776, Lewis became a brigadier general, overseeing Virginia's defense and raising men for the Continental Army. Virginia's Committee of Safety called on Lewis to stop Governor Dunmore's raids along the coast from his last stronghold, a fortified position on Gwynn's Island in the Chesapeake Bay. On July 9, 1776, Lewis led Virginia's forces which captured the island as Lord Dunmore escaped by sea, sailing to the Caribbean, never to return. Thus Lewis protected Norfolk and the Hampton Roads area.

On April 15, 1777, Lewis resigned his commission, citing poor health. He also faced discontent among his men as well as in the army as a whole. Lt. Thomas Townes, present at Gwynn's Island, wrote, "Lewis who after the enemy (Lord Dunmore) were vanquished proved a traitor & suffered them to escape". Moreover, Lewis was bypassed when promotions were announced for Major General in early 1777. George Washington, in need of every able officer, expressed his disappointment to Lewis, who replied, "In my last I intimated to your Excellency the impossibility of my remaining in a disagreeable situation in the army. My being superseded must be viewed as an implicit impeachment of my character. I therefore requested a court of inquiry into my conduct. I believe the time is now at hand, when I can leave this department without any damage to the public interest. When that is the case, I will wait on your Excellency, not doubting my request will be granted, and that I shall be able to acquit myself of every charge, which malice or envy can bring against me." March 17, 1777.

Later years and death
Botetourt County voters continued to support Lewis and in 1780 elected him to the Virginia House of Delegates following formation of the Commonwealth, though his service proved brief because later that year, Governor Thomas Jefferson appointed him to the Executive Council. The following year, Lewis fell ill while returning home from a council meeting; he died of fever in Bedford County near Lynchburg on September 26. His remains were returned for burial in the family plot at his home, where his grave site was unmarked. Colonel Elijah McClanahan, who married Lewis' granddaughter, Agatha Lewis McClanahan, attended his funeral as a young man, and later identified his grave to Roanoke County's Clerk of the Court. In 1887 General Lewis' remains were re-interred in the East Hill Cemetery at Salem, Virginia.

Legacy
Lewisburg, West Virginia, is named after Andrew Lewis.
A statue of Lewis is among those honoring Virginia patriots (including Thomas Jefferson, Patrick Henry, George Mason, Thomas Nelson, and John Marshall) on Richmond's Washington Monument in Capitol Square.
A memorial at the Salem Civic Center in Salem, Virginia, features a statue of Lewis next to a cannon.
Andrew Lewis High School, now Andrew Lewis Middle School, opened in 1931 in Salem.  Some residents petitioned unsuccessfully for the new high school in Salem to bear Andrew Lewis' name, but it opened in 1977 as Salem High School.
On March 13, 2001, the General Assembly of Virginia designated the portion of Interstate 81 that traverses Rockbridge, Botetourt, and Roanoke Counties, and the city of Salem as the "Andrew Lewis Memorial Highway."
The Tri-State Area Council of the Boy Scouts of America named its reservation in Ona, West Virginia (near Huntington) after the general.

References

Further reading
Johnson, Patricia G., General Andrew Lewis of Roanoke and Greenbrier. Walpa Publications,1980, .

External links

"Andrew Lewis: A Hero of Salem and Virginia", from the Salem [Virginia] Educational Foundation and Alumni Association
"Andrew Lewis Memorial Highway", from the Virginia Historical Society
The George Washington Equestrian Monument, with pictures of the Andrew Lewis statue on Capitol Square

1720 births
1781 deaths
Continental Army generals
Continental Army officers from Virginia
House of Burgesses members
People of Virginia in the French and Indian War
People from County Donegal
People in Dunmore's War
Virginia colonial people
British America army officers
People from Salem, Virginia
18th-century American politicians